The Conference Challenge Trophy is a knockout cup competition organised by the Rugby Football League for both the National Conference League and Conference League South clubs.

Results

External links
 Challenge Trophy at The RFL website

Rugby Football League
Competitions